Basketball was contested at the Far Eastern Championship Games and was one of the eight main sports on the programme.

Given its close connection with the United States, the Philippines was the most developed basketball nation among the game's main three participants. The Philippines won nine of the ten basketball tournaments held from 1913 to 1934, being defeated only on one occasion by China at the 1921 Shanghai Games.

Editions

Medal summary
As 1934

References

Basketball
Far Eastern Championship Games
Far Eastern Championship Games